Samuel Timmins (1826–1902) was a Shakespearean scholar.

Samuel Timmins may also refer to:
Sam Timmins (born 1997), New Zealand basketball player
Sammy Timmins (1879–1956), English footballer